Borremose is a raised bog in central Himmerland, Denmark south east of the town of Aars. The name translates directly as 'Borre'-bog, where 'Borre' might well be a derivation of the old word burgh meaning fortified place, as seen in many other place-names. 

The northern part of the bog is heavily overgrown with trees and shrubs nowadays and is inaccessible in most places. Furthermore, due to industrial turf-production during and after World War II, large parts of the bog has turned into lakes.

Archaeology
Borremose is famous for being the finding site of more than three bog bodies (Late Bronze Age)   and a fortified settlement (Martens 1994).

Borremose is known for and identified with a former fortified settlement dating from the Pre-Roman Iron Age (400-100 BC)    . It was constructed during the 4th century BC, as one of the largest structures of its kind in Northern Europe, but was already abandoned during the 2nd century BC, when the houses were burned down and the whole site levelled to the ground. The area was used for agricultural purposes during the 1st century AD, after which it was abandoned and left to the bog. The site was rediscovered in 1929 when the bog was being turned into arable land. The fortified settlement of Borremose comprised a 140 x 90 m gravel bank surrounded by a moat with earth mounds on the inner side and connected to dry land by a 150 metres artificial cobbled road. The 450 m long moat, was 4 m wide, 1,5 m deep and with a flat bottom. The settlement consisted of what seem to be ordinary long houses though without byre.  At the most about 20 long houses may have been in use at the same time. After the excavation, the house sites were marked with turf walls so the settlement plan is visible for the visitor today; furthermore, the moats have been emptied and the walls reconstructed. For a long time, the Borremose-fortification was the only known Iron Age fortified settlement in Scandinavia, until a similar construction was discovered at Lyngsmose near Ringkøbing in western Jutland in 1999. Because of this, such structures are sometimes referred to as "Borremose-fortifications", regardless of their whereabouts.

Some of the finds from Borremose are on exhibit at Museumcentre Aars in the town of Aars, either as copies or originals. The museum centre presents many other interesting finds from western Himmerland, like Scandinavias oldest known human skull, 10,000 years old from the Maglemosian culture. Since Borremose is so inaccessible, it is estimated to hold many interesting finds for the future.

The land around Borremose has revealed several individual settlements from the Nordic Iron Age and a few kilometres south east of the boglands, the village of Østerbølle with 9 longhouses and a number of small houses, has recently been restored.

There are a number of Stone Age and Bronze Age barrows near the bog. Graves from the Iron Age has also been found.

The famous silver "Gundestrup cauldron" was found in the minor bog of Rævemosen less than 1 km to the north of Borremose in 1891. A bronze kettle made by Etruscans around 300 BC, has also been unearthed in the nearby bog of Mosbæk in 1875. In earlier times, Borremose was much larger than what remains today and both Rævemosen and Mosbæk, was an integral part of the Borremose boglands.

In literature
Danish fictive treatments involving Borremose include:

 Ebbe Kløvedal Reich: Fæ og frænde (1977)
 Børge Børresen: Kimbrerborgen; Gyldendal (1948)
 Børge Børresen: Kimbrertoget; Gyldendal (1949)

References

Sources
 Borremose Pdf-pamphlet with maps of the site. Municipality of Vesthimmerland 
 Borremose Danish Agency for Culture
 Borremose Information on Borremosen and the Borremose Fortification. Vesthimmerlands Museum 
 Borremose Vesthimmerlands Museum (pictures)

External links 

 Vesthimmerlands Museum Museumcentre Aars department for cultural history. 
 Borremose 1001 stories of Denmark. Danish Agency for Culture.
 Borremose Vesthimmerlands Museum 

Bogs of Denmark
Archaeological sites in Denmark
Prehistory of Denmark
Bronze Age sites in Europe
Nordic Bronze Age
Germanic archaeological sites
Iron Age sites in Europe
Iron Age Scandinavia
Former populated places in Denmark
Forts in Denmark